Robert H. Hudson (born 1938) is an American visual artist. He is known for his funk art assemblage metal sculptures, but he has also worked in painting and printmaking.

Hudson lives and works in Cotati, Sonoma County, California.

Early life and education 
Robert Hudson was born in 1938 in Salt Lake City, Utah and he grew up in Richland, Washington. At a young age he became interested in making art.

Hudson moved to San Francisco, California for college in 1957. He received a B.F.A degree in 1961 and an M.F.A. degree in 1963, both from California School of Fine Arts (now San Francisco Art Institute or SFAI). Hudson was classmates with William T. Wiley. Hudson studied under Nathan Oliveira, Frank Lobdell, Elmer Bischoff, Jeremy Anderson, Gurdon Woods, and Frank Hamilton.

Career 
Hudson is known for his funk art assemblages, of the late 1950s and 1960s. He has also produced non-objective paintings, ceramics and large steel and bronze sculptures. His first solo exhibition was in 1961 at the Richmond Art Center, while he was still in graduate school.

In 2010, Hudson created a 16-story tall mural made of polychromatic enameled steel panels for One Hawthorne, a condominium building in San Francisco.

Personal life 
He was married in 1962 to artist , whom he met at SFAI. Through his married to Schultz they have two sons, and it eventually ended in divorce. His son Case Hudson (born 1968) is a master printmaker and has worked at Crown Point Press, and Gemini G.E.L.

Hudson's second marriage was to author Mavis Jukes in 1977, and they have two daughters together.

Public collections

Several public museum collections hold work by Hudson, they are:

Addison Gallery of American Art, Andover, Massachusetts,
Albright-Knox Art Gallery, Buffalo, New York,
Art Institute of Chicago, Chicago, Illinois,
Di Rosa Collection, Napa, California,
Fine Arts Museums of San Francisco (FAMSF), San Francisco, California,
National Gallery of Art, Washington, D.C.,
Crocker Art Museum, Sacramento, California,
Henry Art Gallery, University of Washington, Seattle, Washington,
Hirshhorn Museum and Sculpture Garden, Washington, D.C.,
Honolulu Museum of Art, Honolulu, Hawaii,
Los Angeles County Museum of Art, Los Angeles, California,
Museum of Fine Arts, Boston, Boston, Massachusetts,
Museum of Modern Art, New York City, New York,
Museum of Sonoma County, Santa Rosa, California,
Oakland Museum of California, Oakland, California,
Palm Springs Desert Museum, Palm Springs, California,
Philadelphia Museum of Art, Philadelphia, Pennsylvania,
Saint Louis Art Museum, Saint Louis, Missouri,
San Francisco Museum of Modern Art, San Francisco, California,
Smithsonian American Art Museum, Washington, D.C.,
Stedelijk Museum, Amsterdam, The Netherlands,
Utah Museum of Fine Arts, Salt Lake City, Utah,
Whitney Museum of American Art, New York City, New York

References

Further reading 
 Beal, Graham W.J., Jan Butterfield & Michael Schwager, Robert Hudson, a Survey, San Francisco, San Francisco Museum of Art, 1985.
 Brooks, Rosetta, Christine Giles & Katherine Plake Hough, Collaborations: William Allan, Robert Hudson, William Wiley, Palm Springs, Calif., Palm Springs Desert Museum, 1998.
 Reynolds, Jock, Robert Hudson and Richard Shaw, New Ceramic Sculpture, Andover, MA, Addison Gallery of American Art, 1998.
 Rose Art Museum, Robert Hudson, Sculpture, William T. Wiley, Painting: Patrons and Friends, Waltham, Mass., Rose Art Museum, Brandeis University, 1991.
Schjeldahl. Peter, East and West and ROBERT HUDSON, Philadelphia, Pennsylvania, Moore College of Art Gallery, 1977.
 San Francisco Museum of Art, Robert Hudson / Richard Shaw, Work in Porcelain, San Francisco, San Francisco Museum of Art, 1973.

External links
 

1938 births
Living people
Painters from California
San Francisco Art Institute alumni
20th-century American painters
American male painters
21st-century American painters
21st-century American male artists
Modern painters
American contemporary painters
American ceramists
20th-century American sculptors
20th-century American male artists
American male sculptors
Sculptors from California
21st-century ceramists